Rafael Sánchez Guerra (28 October 1897 – 2 April 1964) was a Spanish lawyer, journalist and politician who was the 8th president of Real Madrid from 31 May 1935 until 4 August 1936.

His presidency at Real Madrid coincided with the Spanish Civil War and Sánchez Guerra, a prominent Republican, refused to flee Madrid as it was about to fall into the hands of Francisco Franco. He was captured, imprisoned by supporters of Franco before escaping to Paris where he became a prominent member of the government-in-exile. During the war itself, Sánchez Guerra had little active involvement in the daily management of Real Madrid, acting with non-official presidents Juan José Vallejo and Antonio Ortega (these two presidents were not elected), running things on his behalf.

He served as Minister without portfolio from 1946 until 1947 in the government-in-exile under prime minister José Giral. From 14 April 1931 until 28 March 1939, Sánchez Guerra was a member of the City Council of Madrid.

References

External link

1897 births
1964 deaths
Lawyers from Madrid
20th-century Spanish lawyers
Spanish politicians
Real Madrid CF presidents
Spanish people of the Spanish Civil War (Republican faction)
Exiles of the Spanish Civil War in France
20th-century Spanish journalists